Guillermo Enrique Marcos Tamborrel Suárez (born 25 April 1960) is a Mexican politician affiliated with the PAN. He served as Senator of the LX and LXI Legislatures of the Mexican Congress representing Querétaro. He also served as federal deputy during the LIX Legislature and a local deputy in the Congress of Querétaro.

References

1960 births
Living people
Politicians from Mexico City
Members of the Senate of the Republic (Mexico)
Members of the Chamber of Deputies (Mexico)
National Action Party (Mexico) politicians
Politicians from Querétaro
21st-century Mexican politicians
Universidad Iberoamericana alumni
Members of the Congress of Querétaro